Lipocosma nigripictalis is a moth in the family Crambidae. It is found from southern Mexico south to Brazil.

References

Moths described in 1898
Glaphyriinae